The uncia (Latin, "twelfth part") was a Roman currency worth one twelfth of an as.

Republican coin
The uncia started as a Roman-Oscan weight of about 23 grams for a 273 gram pound, with Attic weight issues of about 27 grams under the libral standard for a 327 gram pound and was produced occasionally towards the beginning of Roman cast bronze coinage. Obverse types of the uncia include a knucklebone (c. 289–245 BC), a barleycorn (c. 280–245 BC), and the helmeted bust of Roma (from ).

Empire coin
In imperial times the uncia was briefly revived under Trajan (98–117) and Hadrian (117–138). It featured the bust of the emperor on the obverse with no inscription and "SC" (for Senatu Consulto) in a wreath on the reverse. If this issue belonged to the imperial system, meaning it was not a provincial piece, it would be an uncia. This issue may have been made only for circulation in the East.

See also
Duella
Roman currency
Roman Republican coinage

Notes

Coins of ancient Rome